LORAN-C transmitter Salwa is the Whiskey secondary of the Saudi Arabia South LORAN-C Chain ( GRI 7030) and the Whiskey secondary of the Saudi Arabia North LORAN-C Chain (GRI 8830).
It uses for both chains a transmission power of 1000 kW.

References
 Loran-C Chain Information in WGS 84 Coordinates 

Towers in Saudi Arabia
LORAN-C transmitters